Austin Seth Grossman (born June 26, 1969) is an American author and video game designer. He has contributed to The New York Times and has written for a number of video games, most notably Deus Ex and Dishonored.

Life

Grossman was born in Concord, Massachusetts. He graduated from Harvard University in 1991 and is currently a graduate student in English literature at the University of California, Berkeley. He is the twin brother of writer Lev Grossman and brother of sculptor Bathsheba Grossman, and the son of the poet Allen Grossman and the novelist Judith Grossman. Grossman is currently working at Impossible Industries, LLC as a Freelance contractor on various projects. Despite popular belief, Grossman was never employed by Arkane Studios. Grossman's father was born Jewish and his mother was raised Anglican.

Grossman started his career in the game industry by replying to a classified ad in The Boston Globe in May 1992 that led him to Looking Glass Studios, where in System Shock he pioneered the audio log technique for storytelling in narrative games. Grossman has worked with DreamWorks Interactive, Ion Storm, and Crystal Dynamics, and served as Director of Game Design and Interactive Story at Magic Leap.

Novels
Grossman is the author of the novel Soon I Will Be Invincible, which was published by Pantheon Books in 2007.  His second book, entitled YOU, debuted in April 2013. His third novel, Crooked, came out in July 2015.

Works

Books
 Soon I Will Be Invincible (2007)
 You (2013)
 Crooked (2015)

Short stories
 "Professor Incognito Apologizes: an Itemized List" in The Mad Scientist's Guide to World Domination (2013)

Games
 Ultima Underworld II: Labyrinth of Worlds (1993)
 System Shock (1994)
 Flight Unlimited (1995)
 Terra Nova: Strike Force Centauri (1996)
 Trespasser (1998)
 Deus Ex (2000)
 Clive Barker's Undying (2001)
 Battle Realms (2001)
 Thief: Deadly Shadows (2004)
 Tomb Raider: Legend (2006)
 Frontlines: Fuel of War (2008)
 Dishonored (2012)
 Dishonored 2 (2016)

References

External links 

 Profile of Austin Grossman from Wired.com
 "Star Spangled Schlemiel," The New York Times editorial on death of Captain America
 1998 Editorial on Interactivity and Content 
 Short story, "Top Secret", at Granta

 

21st-century American novelists
American male novelists
American video game designers
Jewish video game developers
Video game writers
20th-century American Jews
Harvard Advocate alumni
University of California, Berkeley people
Living people
Place of birth missing (living people)
American twins
1969 births
21st-century American male writers
21st-century American Jews